Karel Svoboda may refer to:

 Karel Svoboda (composer) (1938–2007), Czech composer of popular music
 Karel Svoboda (artist) (1824–1870), Czech/Austrian painter
 Karel Svoboda (scientist) (born 1965), neuroscientist
 Karel Svoboda (table tennis), Czech table tennis player